Ángel Rovere (born 1897, date of death unknown) was an Argentine weightlifter. He competed in the men's middleweight event at the 1924 Summer Olympics.

References

External links
 

1897 births
Year of death missing
Argentine male weightlifters
Olympic weightlifters of Argentina
Weightlifters at the 1924 Summer Olympics
Place of birth missing